Melanie Jue (born March 30, 1988) is a Canadian ice hockey defenceman and coach. She served as an assistant coach to the Chinese national ice hockey team during the 2021–22 season.

Career
From 2006 to 2010, she studied at Cornell University, in the United States, where she played with the Cornell Big Red women's ice hockey program and also played as goaltender on the university's field hockey team. Across 106 NCAA games, she scored 41 points. She scored twice in the NCAA championship game in her senior season, as Cornell lost in triple overtime.

From 2012 to 2015, she coached at the Pursuit of Excellence Academy in British Columbia, and from 2015 to 2017, she served as an assistant coach for the Lindenwood Lady Lions ice hockey programme.

In 2017, she signed her first professional contract with the expansion Kunlun Red Star WIH of the Canadian Women's Hockey League (CWHL). She scored 10 points in 28 games in her rookie season, as the club made it to the 2018 Clarkson Cup final. She would stay with the team as they merged with the Vanke Rays in the 2018 off-season, and as the team moved to the Zhenskaya Hockey League in Russia after the collapse of the CWHL in 2019.

Personal life  
Jue has represented Canada internationally at the International Street and Ball Hockey Federation women's world championships. Her cousin, Bryan Chiu, played for the Montreal Alouettes in the Canadian Football League.

References

External links
 

1988 births
Living people
Ball hockey players
Canadian expatriate ice hockey players in China
Canadian expatriate ice hockey people in the United States
Canadian sportspeople of Chinese descent
Canadian women's ice hockey forwards
Cornell Big Red women's ice hockey players
Ice hockey people from British Columbia
People from Richmond, British Columbia
Shenzhen KRS Vanke Rays players